Nimbus 4 (also called Nimbus D) was a meteorological satellite. It was the fourth in a series of the Nimbus program.

Launch 
Nimbus 4 was launched on April 8, 1970, by a Thor-Agena rocket from Vandenberg Air Force Base, Lompoc, CA. The spacecraft functioned nominally until 30 Sep 1980. The satellite orbited the Earth once every 1 hour and 47 minutes, at an inclination of 80°.

Mission
Nimbus 4, the fourth in a series of second-generation meteorological research and development satellites, was designed to serve as a stabilized, earth-oriented platform for the testing of advanced meteorological sensor systems, and for collecting meteorological data. The polar-orbiting spacecraft consisted of three major structures: a ring-shaped sensor mount, solar paddles, and the control system housing.

The solar paddles and the control system were connected to the sensor mount by a truss structure, giving the satellite the appearance of an ocean buoy. The torus-shaped sensor mount, which formed the satellite base, housed the electronics equipment and battery modules. The lower surface of the torus ring provided mounting space for sensors and telemetry antennas. An H-frame structure mounted within the center of the torus provided support for the larger experiments and tape recorders. Mounted on the control system housing, which was on top of the spacecraft, were Sun sensors, horizon scanners, gas nozzles for attitude control, and a command antenna. Use of an advanced attitude-control subsystem permitted the spacecraft's orientation to be controlled to within plus or minus 1 deg for all three axes (pitch, roll, and yaw). Primary experiments consisted of:

 Image Dissector Camera System (IDCS): for providing daytime cloud cover pictures, both in real-time and recorded modes;
 Temperature-Humidity Infrared Radiometer (THIR): for measuring daytime and nighttime surface and cloudtop temperatures as well as the water vapor content of the upper atmosphere;
 Infrared Interferometer Spectrometer (IRIS): for measuring the emission spectra of the earth/atmosphere system;
 Satellite Infrared Spectrometer (SIRS): for determining the vertical profiles of temperature and water vapor in the atmosphere;
 Monitor of Ultraviolet Solar Energy (MUSE): for detecting solar UV radiation;
 Backscatter Ultraviolet (BUV): detector for monitoring the vertical distribution and total amount of atmospheric ozone on a global scale;
 Filter Wedge Spectrometer (FWS): for accurate measurement of IR radiance as a function of wavelength from the earth/atmosphere system;
 Selective Chopper Radiometer (SCR): for determining the temperatures of six successive  layers in the atmosphere from absorption measurements in the 15 μm  band;
 Interrogation, Recording, and Location System (IRLS): for locating, interrogating, recording, and retransmitting meteorological and geophysical data from remote collection stations.

The spacecraft performed well until 14 April 1971, when attitude problems started. The experiments operated on a limited time basis after that time until 30 September 1980.

References

Weather satellites of the United States
Spacecraft launched in 1970